The Palomino is a 1950 American Western film directed by Ray Nazarro and written by Tom Kilpatrick. The film stars Jerome Courtland, Beverly Tyler, Joseph Calleia, Roy Roberts, Gordon Jones and Robert Osterloh. The film was released on March 18, 1950, by Columbia Pictures.

Plot

Cast          
Jerome Courtland as Steve Norris
Beverly Tyler as Maria Guevara
Joseph Calleia as Miguel Gonzales
Roy Roberts as Ben Lane
Gordon Jones as Bill Hennessey
Robert Osterloh as Sam Drake 
Tom Trout as Williams
Harry Garcia as Johnny
Trevor Bardette as Brown
Juan Duval as Manuel
Sam Flint as Veterinarian

References

External links
 

1950 films
1950s English-language films
American Western (genre) films
1950 Western (genre) films
Columbia Pictures films
Films directed by Ray Nazarro
1950s American films